The Zombie is a Tiki cocktail made of fruit juices, liqueurs, and various rums. It first appeared in late 1934, invented by Donn Beach at his Hollywood Don the Beachcomber restaurant. It was popularized on the East coast soon afterwards at the 1939 New York World's Fair.

History
Legend has it that Donn Beach originally concocted the Zombie to help a hung-over customer get through a business meeting. The customer returned several days later to complain that he had been turned into a zombie for his entire trip. Its smooth, fruity taste works to conceal its extremely high alcoholic content. Don the Beachcomber restaurants limited their customers to two Zombies apiece because of their potency, which Beach said could make one "like the walking dead."

According to the original recipe, the Zombie cocktail included three different kinds of rum, lime juice, falernum, Angostura bitters, Pernod, grenadine, and "Don's Mix", a combination of cinnamon syrup and grapefruit juice.

Beach was very cautious with the recipes of his original cocktails. His instructions for his bartenders contained coded references to ingredients, the contents of which were only known to him. Beach had reason to worry; a copy of the Zombie was served at the 1939 New York World's Fair by a man trying to take credit for it named Monte Proser (later of the mob-tied Copacabana).

Beach's original recipes for the Zombie and other Tiki drinks have been published in Sippin' Safari by Jeff "Beachbum" Berry.  Berry researched the origins of many Tiki cocktails, interviewing bartenders from Don the Beachcomber's and other original Tiki places and digging up other original sources. Sippin' Safari details Beach's development of the Zombie with three different recipes dating from 1934 to 1956.

The Zombie was occasionally served heated (a drink more commonly known today as the I.B.A. Hot Zombie), as outlined by the Catering Industry Employee (CIE) journal:  "Juice of 1 lime, unsweetened pineapple juice, bitters, 1 ounce heavily bodied rum, 2 ounces of Gold Label rum, 1 ounce of White Label rum, 1 ounce of apricot-flavored brandy, 1 ounce of papaya juice"

The cocktail is named in the lyrics for the song "Haitian Divorce" on the 1976 album The Royal Scam by Steely Dan.

Tiki culture influence
Due to the popularity of the cocktail during the Tiki craze and the fact that Beach kept his recipe secret and occasionally altered it, there are many variations of the Zombie served at other restaurants and bars (some tasting nothing like the original cocktail). The word zombie also began to be used at other tiki themed establishments, such as at the Zombie Hut and Zombie Village.

Trader Vic also listed a recipe for the Zombie in his 1947 Bartender's Guide. Other competitors created drinks linked to the zombie. At Stephen Crane's Chicago Kon-Tiki Ports restaurant they featured a drink on the menu called The Walking Dead'': "Makes the dead walk and talk. For those who want immediate action - meet the first cousin to the famous 'Zombie'. Demerara 151 rum. 90¢."

References

External links 

 Zombie at the Bartender's Database
 The Cocktail Spirit With Robert Hess:  Zombie (video)  - features 1956 Donn Beach recipe
 
 

Tiki drinks
Cocktails with rum
Zombies
Cocktails with Angostura bitters
Cocktails with grenadine
Cocktails with anise-flavored liquors
Cocktails with lime juice
Cocktails with grapefruit juice